Roll of Honour may refer to:

A war memorial 
A memorial list of names of people who have died in military, police service or other services
"Roll of Honour" (song), an Irish Republican song praising the participants in the 1981 Irish Hunger Strike

See also
Honor Roll (disambiguation)
Role of Honour, a 1984 James Bond novel by John Gardner